Ivana Milošević (born 11 June 1982, in Svilajnac) is a Serbian handballer who plays for the Serbian club ŽRK Radnički Kragujevac and the Serbian national team.

National team
Milošević represented Serbia and Montenegro at the 2005 Mediterranean Games and won a silver medal. She played for the Serbian national team at the 2012 European Handball Championship when the team finished 4th.

References

External links
 EHF Profile

Living people
1982 births
People from Svilajnac
Serbian female handball players

Mediterranean Games silver medalists for Serbia
Competitors at the 2005 Mediterranean Games
Mediterranean Games medalists in handball